The Oak Fire was a destructive wildfire that burned north of the community of Bootjack in Mariposa County, California and in the Sierra National Forest, during the 2022 California wildfire season. The fire was reported on July 22, 2022, and burned  before being fully contained on August 10, 2022.

Events 
The Oak Fire was first reported on July 22, 2022. Multiple state fire officials reported unprecedented fire behavior, particularly during the first day of the incident, saying it was "some of the most extreme behavior" that they had seen. A pyrocumulus cloud created by the fire could be seen as far away as Reno, Nevada. The fire spread quickly, in part due to long-range ember spotting of over a mile. The fire burned through the footprint of the 2013 Carstens Fire.

On July 23, 2022, Governor of California Gavin Newsom declared a state of emergency in Mariposa County as a result of the fire.

By the morning of July 24, the third day of the fire, 2,093 personnel were battling the fire, according to Cal Fire. This included 17 helicopters, 225 fire engines, and 58 bulldozers to create firebreaks. The fire moved north and east, approaching and entering the older burn scars of the 2019 Briceburg Fire and the 2018 Ferguson Fire.

The total cost of the firefighting effort reached $93 million.

Impacts

Closures and evacuations 
The Oak Fire threatened multiple communities in rural Mariposa County, including Darrah, Midpines, and Jerseydale.

Some residents of Mariposa County expressed concerns regarding the presence and participation of uniformed militia members during evacuation efforts, prompting the Mariposa Sheriff's Office to clarify that they had not activated the militia.

Environmental 
In parts of the Sierra Nevada, such as the Lake Tahoe Basin, the smoke caused poor visibility and plummeting air qualities, reaching unhealthy to hazardous levels.

See also 

 2022 California wildfires
 Washburn Fire, another 2022 wildfire in Mariposa County in Yosemite National Park

References 

Wildfires in Mariposa County, California
2022 California wildfires
July 2022 events in the United States
Sierra National Forest